A blue-collar worker is a working-class person who performs manual labor.

Blue collar can also refer to:

 Blue-collar crime, a crime typically associated with the working class
 Blue Collar Comedy Tour, a comedy ensemble consisting of Jeff Foxworthy, Larry the Cable Guy, Bill Engvall and Ron White
 Blue Collar TV, a comedy show based on the tour.
 Blue Collar (film), a 1978 film written and directed by Paul Schrader
 Blue Collar (album), a 2006 album by rapper Rhymefest
 "Blue Collar" a popular song from the self-titled debut album, Bachman–Turner Overdrive (from BTO)
 "Blue Collar", a popular rock song from the Prism album, Beat Street